Royce Jones (born December 15, 1954) is an American musician best known for his work as a touring vocalist with the bands Steely Dan (in 1973 and 1974) and Ambrosia (joined 1978). In the studio, Jones contributed vocals to David Pack's Anywhere You Go, Odyssey's self-titled release, Steely Dan's Countdown to Ecstasy, Bruzer's Round 1 and Stephan Cohn's self-titled release. 

In the summer of 2007, Jones joined a coverband called Screamin Lehman Band. The group's official site says they cover the songs of "Boz Scaggs, The Cars, Steely Dan, Stevie Winwood, and Elvin Bishop".

Royce Jones is now in The Royce Jones band, also formally a member of eight piece horn band called "Stonebridge". He also worked with The Platters. Royce was the lead singer of Odyssey (Motown).

Royce Jones also performed on Richard Simmons' Sweatin To The Oldies 3 & 4 videos.

In 2011 - 2012 he worked with the Tim Weisberg Band, Chuck Alvarez and Paul Turner.

References

External links
 Royce Jones at ArtistDirect

1954 births
Living people
American soul singers
Ambrosia (band) members